The Eisenmann Medal is awarded by the Linnaean Society of New York (LSNY) in recognition of the recipient's ornithological excellence and encouragement of amateur efforts in ornithology and birding.

The medal commemorates the ornithologist and prominent LSNY member Eugene Eisenmann (1906-1981).  It has been awarded since 1983; in some years no medal is awarded.

Eisenmann medalists

Source: Linnaean Society of New York
 1983 - Ernst Mayr
 1984 - Joseph J. Hickey
 1985 - Olin Sewall Pettingill
 1986 - Roger Tory Peterson
 1987 - Chandler S. Robbins
 1988 - Frank B. Gill
 1989 - Helen Hays
 1990 - C. Stuart Houston
 1991 - David B. Wingate
 1993 - G. Stuart Keith
 1995 - Guy Tudor
 1998 - Dean Amadon
 2001 - Robert S. Ridgeley
 2002 - William S. Clark
 2003 - F. Gary Stiles
 2004 - David J.T. Hussell and Erica H. Dunn
 2005 - John W. Fitzpatrick
 2006 - David A. Sibley
 2008 - Malcolm C. Coulter
 2009 - Kenneth V. Rosenberg
 2011 - Alvaro Jaramillo
 2012 - Clive Minton
 2013 - Kenn Kaufman
 2014 - Sophie Webb
 2016 - Tim Birkhead
 2017 - Peter Harrison
 2018 - John P. O'Neill
 2020 - Stephen W. Kress
 2021 - Peter and Rosemary Grant
 2022 - Jennie Duberstein

See also
 List of ornithology awards

References

Ornithology awards
American science and technology awards
1983 establishments in the United States